Hando Mugasto (until 1925 Heinrich-Voldemar Monstrum; 18 January 1907 Rakvere – 11 June 1937 Tartu) was an Estonian printmaker, neorealist.

1924-1933 he studied at Pallas Art School. 1935-1937 he was a pedagogue in this school.

Gallery

References

Further reading
 Solomõkova, Irina (1984). "Hando Mugasto 1907-1937, Tema elu, tema looming, tema aeg". Kunst

1907 births
1937 deaths
Estonian printmakers
20th-century Estonian male artists
People from Rakvere